Gutter Queen is an album by Cable, released in 1999 by Hydra Head Records. The album was produced by Jeff Caxide, the group's original bass player.

Track listing
All tracks written by Cable, except "Planet Caravan", originally written by Black Sabbath.

 "The Sunday Dinner" – 5:45
 "Not Today I'm Not" – 6:16
 "Clinton St. Blues" – 2:47
 "Human Interest Story" – 2:53
 "Work Related Injury" – 4:19
 "Long Distance Dedication" – 3:46
 "Both Barrels" – 5:11
 "Dot. Com." – 2:13
 [Silence] – 4:29
 [Silence] – 0:04
 "Planet Caravan" – 2:50
 [Silence] – 0:24

Cable (American band) albums
1999 albums
Hydra Head Records albums